Chen Aisen (born 22 October 1995) is a Chinese diver. He is a double gold medal winner at the 2016 Summer Olympics. He won gold in the men's synchronised 10m platform competition with diving partner Lin Yue, as well as gold in the men's individual 10m platform. He has also won golds in the World Championships partnered with Yang Hao and Cao Yuan.

Early life
Chen was born in Guangzhou, China. He started diving while he was at primary school, selected for his potential in diving. He studied at Jinan University in Guangzhou.

Diving career
In 2009, Chen won a gold medal in the men's 10m synchronized event at the East Asian Games with his partner Zhang Yanquan. Chen was just 14. In the next several years, Chen competed in the FINA Diving Grand Prix competitions and won an assortment of medals. In 2014, Chen and Zhang won the 10m synchro event at the Asian Championships.

Olympic Games
At the 2016 Summer Olympics, Chen and Lin won the gold medal in the 10m synchro event with an overall score of 496.98. He also won the gold medal in the 10m platform event with a score of 585.30. His victory marks the first time China had won the Olympic gold in the men's 10m platform since the 2004 Summer Olympic Games in Athens. Later that year, FINA named Chen as the Male Diver of the Year.

At the 2020 Tokyo Olympics held in 2021, Chen, now paired with Cao Yuan, won silver in the Men's synchronised 10 m platform event behind Matty Lee and Tom Daley.

World Championships
In 2015, Chen was partnered with Lin when they won the 10m synchro event at the World Championships in Kazan. Their overall score was 495.72. In 2017, Chen won another gold medal in the 10m synchro event with his new partner, Yang Hao. He also received the silver medal in the individual 10m platform event, which was won by British diver Tom Daley.

At the 2019 World Aquatics Championships held in Gwangju, South Korea, Chen partnered with Cao Yuan in the 10m synchro and won gold.

World Cup
At the 2016 FINA Diving World Cup, Chen won the gold medal in the 10m synchro competition and the silver medal in the 10m platform competition.

World Series
During the 2013 FINA Diving World Series, Chen won three gold medals in the 10m synchro events with Lin in the Moscow, Dubai, and Beijing legs. He was also the silver medal winner in the individual events in Beijing and Dubai. In 2014, Chen teamed up with Yang Jian to win one gold medal and one silver medal in the 10m synchro event.

Chen was partnered with Lin in 2015. They won a total of five gold medals in the 10m synchro events. During the following year, the two of them won the 10m synchro competitions in all four legs. Chen also competed in the 10m platform events, where he won three gold medals and one silver medal. He achieved a higher score than fellow Chinese diver Qiu Bo in three of the legs.

In 2017, Chen won multiple gold medals in the 10m platform and 10m synchro events. In the Guangzhou leg, Chen achieved an overall score of 601.15, which made him the fifth diver in history to collect over 600 points on the platform after Lin, Qiu, Yang, and Cao Yuan.

Competitive history

References

External links

1995 births
Living people
Asian Games gold medalists for China
Asian Games medalists in diving
Chinese male divers
Divers at the 2014 Asian Games
Divers at the 2018 Asian Games
Divers at the 2016 Summer Olympics
Divers at the 2020 Summer Olympics
Medalists at the 2014 Asian Games
Medalists at the 2018 Asian Games
Medalists at the 2016 Summer Olympics
Medalists at the 2020 Summer Olympics
Olympic gold medalists for China
Olympic silver medalists for China
Olympic medalists in diving
Olympic divers of China
Sportspeople from Guangzhou
World Aquatics Championships medalists in diving
20th-century Chinese people
21st-century Chinese people